Sidney Herbert, 16th Earl of Pembroke, 13th Earl of Montgomery (9 January 1906 – 16 March 1969) was a British peer.

Life and career
Herbert was the son of Reginald Herbert, 15th Earl of Pembroke and Beatrice Eleanor Paget (of the marquesses of Anglesey). His ancestor, the 11th Earl of Pembroke, married Countess Catherine Vorontsov, the daughter of a prominent aristocratic Russian family.

Pembroke was educated at Eton and Pembroke College, Oxford. He served in World War II in the Royal Artillery. He was Comptroller and Private Secretary to the Duchess of Kent, 1942–1948, as well as Equerry to the Duke of Kent. He was a Trustee of the National Gallery, 1942–1949 and 1953–1960; Trustee of the National Portrait Gallery, 1944–1958; Member of the Historical Manuscripts Commission, 1941–1958. President of Historic Churches Trust. Justice of the Peace, 1954. Lord Lieutenant of Wiltshire, 1954–1969, and an alderman of Wiltshire County Council, 1954–1967.

On 27 July 1936 he married Lady Mary Dorothea Hope, daughter of the late John Hope, 1st Marquess of Linlithgow and the Dowager Marchioness of Linlithgow. The couple had two children: Lady Diana Mary Herbert (19 April 1937–24 November 2008) and Henry George Charles Herbert (19 May 1939–7 October 2003). He was succeeded by his son.

References

1906 births
1969 deaths
Alumni of Pembroke College, Oxford
Sidney Herbert, 16th Earl of Pembroke
16
Sidney
Lord-Lieutenants of Wiltshire
Members of Wiltshire County Council
People educated at Eton College
British people of Russian descent
Royal Artillery officers
20th-century English nobility